The Study of the Negro Problems, from The Annals of the American Academy of Political and Social Science (January 1898), is an essay written by professor, sociologist, historian and activist W. E. B. Du Bois. It both challenges the question he poses in his The Souls of Black Folk (1903) of “How does it feel to be a problem?” and is reminiscent of the popular mindset of white people toward people of color at the time.

As a reoccurring theme amid Du Bois’ works, the Negro as a problem to those representing the majority population was a concept into which Du Bois sought to delve further as he explored what it meant to be a minority – and an educated one – among those who still viewed minorities as a nuisance to their culture or else a burden and creatures not belonging as one of their own.

An introduction to another one of his familiar concepts - that of the black double-consciousness - the question of how it feels to be a problem is intended for Negro men and women to keep in the back of their minds. As people of conflicting identities of both Negro and American in a white American world, they should be constantly mindful of this while they discern how they fit in as citizens moving through a racially disconnected New World based on the outward perceptions of them from the white majority race.

The focus of The Study of the Negro Problems is on the means of law enforcement used to separate blacks from their white counterparts and how social forces, as responses to the African slaves’ introduction into America, forced these laws onto the slaves and their ancestors.

References

Works by W. E. B. Du Bois
1898 essays